All three elections, following the 2007 municipal reform, had resulted in the Social Democrats becoming the biggest party and having a majority behind them to hold the mayor position.

The Social Democrats had won 13 seats in the last election, just 2 short of an absolute majority. Parties of the traditional red bloc had enjoyed great success in Odense Municipality, having won 17 seats in 2009, 15 in 2013 and 18 in 2017. Therefore, it was expected that they would once again win a majority, and that Peter Rahbæk Juhl would have a second term.

When all the votes were counted, the Social Democrats would suffer the biggest losses. They would lose 3 seats, and decrease their vote share by 10.5%. This trend was seen in the 4 largest municipalities. However, both the Danish Social Liberal Party and Green Left would gain a seat, and the red bloc parties would win 16 seats. 
A constitution was announced on 18 November 2021, which confirmed that Peter Rahbæk Juhl would continue as mayor.

Electoral system
For elections to Danish municipalities, a number varying from 9 to 31 are chosen to be elected to the municipal council. The seats are then allocated using the D'Hondt method and a closed list proportional representation.
Odense Municipality had 29 seats in 2021

Unlike in Danish General Elections, in elections to municipal councils, electoral alliances are allowed.

Electoral alliances 

Electoral Alliance 1

Electoral Alliance 2

Electoral Alliance 3

Electoral Alliance 4

Results

Notes

References 

Odense